Kizhuthani is a small village in the town of Irinjalakuda in Trisshur District, Kerala, India.

The Aal (a huge banyan tree) was the attraction of this place until it fell during a thunderstorm. A new one was planted in its place and is currently one of the largest trees around that area. It is one of the famous town of Karalam Panchayat. 
JK Theater, which is one of  Irinjalakuda's first AC Theaters, was built in Kizhuthani. The main area or junction of Kizhuthani is a market.
The roads adjoin to many other connecting major roads of that area.

Temples around Kizhuthani
 Mahavishnu Temple
 Bagavathi temple
 Vettiyattil Sree Bhadrakali temple
 Kunjilikattil Annapoorneswari Temple
 Pattat Durga Devi Temple
 Kizhuthani Marassari Sree Bhadrakali Temple

Schools around Kizhuthani

R.M.L.P School Kizhuthani

References

External links
 Wikimapia Link to Kizhuthani

Villages in Thrissur district